Norbert Likulia Bolongo (born 8 July 1939) is a Congolese former politician and general. He served as the last Prime Minister of Zaire from 9 April 1997 to 16 May 1997, before his deposition after the First Congo War. He was born in Basoko, Orientale Province, Belgian Congo. Bolongo attended Aix-Marseille University in France.

References

1939 births
Living people
People from Tshopo
Prime Ministers of the Democratic Republic of the Congo
Aix-Marseille University alumni
21st-century Democratic Republic of the Congo people